The Canton of Pavilly is a former canton situated in the Seine-Maritime département and in the Haute-Normandie region of northern France. It was disbanded following the French canton reorganisation which came into effect in March 2015. It had a total of 31,229 inhabitants (2012).

Geography 
The altitude varies from 17m (Betteville) to 182m (Butot) with an average altitude of 124m.

The canton comprised 22 communes:

Barentin
Beautot
Betteville
Blacqueville
Bouville
Butot
Carville-la-Folletière
Croix-Mare
Écalles-Alix
Émanville
La Folletière
Fresquiennes
Fréville
Goupillières
Gueutteville
Limésy
Mesnil-Panneville
Mont-de-l'If
Pavilly
Sainte-Austreberthe
Saint-Ouen-du-Breuil
Villers-Écalles

Population

See also 
 Arrondissements of the Seine-Maritime department
 Cantons of the Seine-Maritime department
 Communes of the Seine-Maritime department

References

Pavilly
2015 disestablishments in France
States and territories disestablished in 2015